Gallou is a surname. Notable people with the surname include:

 Gilles Gallou, French football player
 Bertrand Gallou (born 1974), French former professional football player
 Yves-Marie Le Gallou, French politician
 Jean-Yves Le Gallou (born 1948), French politician, member of the European Parliament

Surnames of Breton origin
Breton-language surnames